Kariong Mountains High School is a government-funded co-educational comprehensive secondary day school, located in , a suburb of Gosford, in the Central Coast region of New South Wales, Australia.

Established on 22 February 2010 for students in Year 7 and Year 8 only, the school enrolled 540 students in 2018, from Year 7 to Year 12, of whom five percent identified as Indigenous Australians and ten percent were from a language background other than English. The school is operated by the NSW Department of Education; the principal is Anne Vine.

History 
Most of the Parklands, including the Kariong Mountains High School site, are listed on the New South Wales State Heritage Register.

Notable students
Dylan Littlehalesparacanoeist competed in the 2016 Rio Paralympics

See also 

 List of government schools in New South Wales
 Education in Australia

References

External links
 
NSW Schools website

Public high schools in New South Wales
Central Coast (New South Wales)
2010 establishments in Australia
Educational institutions established in 2010